Cephalotes pallidus is a species of arboreal ant of the genus Cephalotes, characterized by an odd shaped head, and the ability to "parachute" by steering their fall if they drop from a tree - a characteristic also contributing to their name as gliding ants.

References

pallidus